Seven ships of the French Navy have borne the name Sagittaire in honour of the constellation Sagittarius:

Ships 
 , a 50-gun ship of the line.
 , a hired ship.
 , an auxiliary troopship.
 , a coastal minesweeper.
 , a Tripartite-class minehunter.

See also

Notes and references

Notes

References

Bibliography 
 
 

French Navy ship names